Hungary, the name in English for the European country, is an exonym derived from the Medieval Latin .

Name of the Hungarians and Hungary

Endonym of the ethnic group and country

Primary sources use several names for the Magyars/Hungarians. However, their original historical endonym/ethnonym — the name they used to refer to themselves in the Early Middle Ages — is uncertain. One of the earliest written mentions of "Magyar" endonym is from 810.

The tribal name  became  in reference to the Hungarian people as a whole. The folk etymology holds that  was derived from the name of Prince Muageris. There are many hypotheses on the origin of this name. The accepted is that the first element  derives from Proto-Ugric *mäńć- ("man", "person"), which is also found in the name of the Mansi (and ). The second element  ("man", "men", and "lineage") survives in Hungarian  ("husband") and is cognate with Mari  ("son") and Finnish archaic  ("young man").

European exonyms for Hungarians and Hungary

The Latin variant  used for them by Widukind of Corvey in his The Deeds of the Saxons of the 10th century is most probably patterned after Middle High German . The Italians called the Hungarians as Ungherese, the country as Ungheria. The "H" prefix before the ethnonym and country name appeared in official Latin language Hungarian documents, royal seals and coins since the reign of king Béla III (r. 1172–1196). The German and Italian languages preserved the original form (without H prefix) of the ethnonym. The addition of the unetymological prefix "H-" in High Medieval-era Latin is most probably due to early historical associations of the Hungarians with the Huns who settled Hungary prior to the Avars and the Hungarians themselves; for example the use by Theophylactus Simocatta of the name "Hunnougour, descendants of the Hun hords".

The ethnonym  is the Latinized form of Byzantine Greek . According to an explanation, the Greek name was borrowed from Old Bulgar ągrinŭ, which was in turn borrowed from Oghur-Turkic On-Ogur (meaning "ten [tribes of the] Ogurs"), the collective name for the tribes which later joined the Bulgar tribal confederacy that ruled the eastern parts of Hungary after the Avars. The Hungarians probably belonged to the Onogur tribal alliance and it is very possible that they became its ethnic majority.

In early medieval sources, in addition to the Hungarians, the exonym  or  referred to the Mansi and Khantys also. It may refer to the Hungarians during a time when they dwelt east of the Ural Mountains along the natural borders of Europe and Asia before the Hungarian conquest of the Carpathian Basin in 895–6. The toponym  or  referred to that territory from around the 12th century. Herodotus in the 5th century BC probably referred to ancestors of the Hungarians when he wrote of the Yugra people living west of the Ural Mountains.

The origin of the English ethnonym and country name 

The English word "Hungary" is derived from Medieval Latin Hungaria.

Hungarian sources
According to one view, following Anonymus's description, the Hungarian federation in the 9th century was called  ("Seven Magyars"):  ("seven princely persons who are called Seven Magyars"), though the Chronicler refers to "seven leading persons" instead of a polity.

Other sources
In Byzantine sources in Medieval Greek, the nation was denominated the "Western ". Hasdai ibn Shaprut denominated the polity "the land of the Hungrin" ("the land of the Hungarians") in a letter to Joseph of the Khazars of c. 960.

The Latin phrase  ("Hungarian Nation") was a medieval and early modern era geographic, institutional and juridico-political category in Kingdom of Hungary without any ethnic connotation. The medieval "Natio Hungarica" consisted only the members of the Hungarian Parliament, which was composed of the nobility, Roman Catholic prelates, and the elected parliamentary envoys of the Royal free cities, which represented the city burghers. The other important - and more numerous - component of Natio Hungarica was the noble members of the county assemblies in the county seats, Kingdom of Hungary had 72 counties, (regardless of the real ethnicity and mother tongue of the noblemen, clergymen and city bourgeoisie of the kingdom). Those who had no direct participation in the political life on national [parliamentary] or local [counties] level (like the common people of the cities, towns, or the peasantry of the villages) were not considered part of the Natio Hungarica. This old medieval origin convention was also adopted officially in the Treaty of Szatmár of 1711 and the Pragmatic Sanction of 1723; remained until 1848, when the Hungarian nobility was abolished; and thereafter acquired a sense of ethnic nationalism.

They were presumably Illyrian tribes that had been Celticized in the 3rd century BC. Julius Pokorny suggested an Illyrian etymology for this name, derived from a PIE root *pen- ("swamp" or "marsh"; cognate with English "fen").

The name "Pannonian" comes from Pannonia, a province of the Roman Empire. Only the western part of the territory (the so-called Transdanubia) of modern Hungary formed part of the ancient Roman Province of Pannonia; this comprises less than 29% of modern Hungary, therefore Hungarian geographers avoid the terms "Pannonian Basin" and "Pannonian Plain".

Modern era
German Princes used the German  or simply , including in diplomas in German or in both German and Latin for established German-speaking Hungarian residents of various municipalities, including Transylvanian Saxons, Zipsers, and Hiänzs, in the 14th century.  was also used from 1849 to the 1860s. The Hungarian  was used in the 1840s and again from the 1860s to 1918.

The Italian  ("Kingdom of Hungary") alone denominated the Free State of Fiume for its existence from 1920–24, the City of Fiume (contemporarily Rijeka, Croatia, but still denominated Fiume in Hungarian) of which the Free State was predominantly comprised having been within the territory of the Kingdom from 1776–1920.

In and during the Austro-Hungarian Empire (1867–1918), Transleithania sometimes unofficially denominated the regions of the territory of the Kingdom of Hungary, but "Lands of the Holy Hungarian Crown of Saint Stephen" officially denominated the Hungarian territory of Austria-Hungary, it having had prior use.

"Lands of the Crown of Saint Stephen"
 
"Lands of the Crown of Saint Stephen" officially denominated the territory of the Kingdom of Hungary when it constituted part of the territory of the later Austro-Hungarian Empire. The Latin neologism  ("Arch-Kingdom of Hungary") sometimes denominates these Hungarian territories qua part of Austria-Hungary, pursuant to Medieval Latin terminology.

("Kingdom of Mary") is a traditional Roman Catholic denomination of Hungary that honors the Blessed Virgin Mary as its symbolic sovereign. The name derives from the tradition that the first Hungarian king, King Saint Stephen I offered the Holy Crown of Hungary and the nation to her as he was dying, because he had no heirs to inherit it. This contract purportedly endows the Holy Crown with Divine power to assist the Hungarian Kings in ruling. The title is also part of the National Motto of Hungary:  ("Kingdom of Mary, the Patroness of Hungary").

 was often used to emphasize the predominant Roman Catholic Faith of Hungary. Some Hungarian religious communities also bear the name to express their intent to honor and imitate the life of St. Mary, including the  Community, whose foundation in 1902 evidences the use of the phrase to denominate Hungary since at least that date.

References

Secondary sources

See also
 Lands of the Crown of Saint Stephen
 Pannonia
 Transleithania
 Yugra

Hungary
Name